The Castaways' Club is a dining club for retired warfare officers (previously known as executive or seaman officers) of the Royal Navy who left the service while still junior officers, typically with the rank of Lieutenant or Lieutenant Commander. The club has no permanent rooms but meets once a year for dinner to which members invite guests who must be serving or retired warfare officers.

History

The Castaways' Club was founded in 1895 'for the purpose of promoting social intercourse between gentlemen who had resigned their commissions as Executive Officers of Her Majesty’s Navy and who were desirous of keeping in touch with their former Service'. The Club has a considerable collection of mess silver which has been donated by guests and members since the Club was founded. This includes a silver cup presented to the club in 1908 by George V who was a frequent guest when Prince of Wales.

Today

Today, the Castaways' Club annual dinner remains very popular in naval circles and the Club has maintained its original purpose. Membership elections are held once a year. Membership is limited to 120 and there is a considerable and undisclosed waiting list.

Notable members

Members of the Club include or have included:

Admiral of the Fleet Prince Charles, Prince of Wales, KG KT
Admiral of the Fleet Prince Philip, Duke of Edinburgh, KG KT
Colonel Sir John Crompton-Inglefield TD DL (late Sub Lieutenant RN)
Commander The Earl Beatty DSC, 2nd Earl Beatty
Commander Lord Sandford DSC
Commander Sir Arthur Trevor Dawson Bt.
Commander Lord Rennell of Rodd, 3rd Baron Rennell
Lieutenant Colonel Sir Martin Archer-Shee KCMG DSO (late Sub Lieutenant RN)
Lieutenant Commander The Earl of Abingdon, 8th Earl of Abingdon, 13th Earl of Lindsey
Lieutenant Commander The Lord Glenconner, 2nd Baron Glenconner
Lieutenant Commander The Viscount Bridport, Duke of Bronte, 3rd Viscount Bridport
Lieutenant Commander The Lord Congleton, 6th Baron Congleton
Lieutenant Commander Sir August Cayzer Bt.
Lieutenant Commander Sir Keith Speed RD
Lieutenant Prince Alexander Albert of Battenberg, Marquess of Carisbrooke GCB GCVO
Lieutenant David Mountbatten OBE DSC, 3rd Marquess of Milford Haven
Lieutenant The Duke of Hamilton, 13th Duke of Hamilton, 10th Duke of Brandon
Lieutenant The Duke of Buccleuch, KT GCVO, 7th Duke of Buccleuch
Lieutenant The Earl of Westmorland, 14th Earl of Westmorland
Lieutenant Lord Ironside, 2nd Baron Ironside
Lieutenant The Lord Janvrin GCB GCVO PC
Lieutenant The Viscount Monsell GBE, 1st Viscount Monsell
Lieutenant Sir William Benyon DL
Lieutenant Sir Timothy Colman KG
Lieutenant Christopher Lewis

References

External links
 "", The Royal Naval Benevolent Trust.

Dining clubs
1895 establishments in the United Kingdom
Royal Navy
Military of the United Kingdom